King's Park (from May 1978 to May 2002 Kings Park) is a ward in the London Borough of Hackney and forms part of the Hackney South and Shoreditch constituency. The ward is subject to minor boundary changes taking place in May 2014. It returns three councillors.

1978–2002
Kings Park ward was created for the 1978 local elections, with an electorate of 4,373.

2002–2014
There was a revision of ward boundaries in Hackney in 2002 and a new King's Park ward was created.

The ward returns three councillors to Hackney London Borough Council, with an election every four years. At the previous election on 6 May 2010 Julius Asabgwiy Nkafu, Sharon Patrick, and Saleem Siddiqui all Labour Party candidates, were returned. Turnout was 58%; with 4,346 votes cast.

King's Park ward has a total population of 10,923, increasing to 11,098 at the 2011 Census.   This compares with the average ward population within the borough of 10,674.

From 2014
Hackney wards are redrawn from May 2014.  The new King's Park ward is mostly unchanged, expanding to the southwest to take in part of the abolished Chatham ward. It has an allocation of three councillors.

References

External links
 London Borough of Hackney list of constituencies and councillors.
 Labour Party profile of Julius Asabgwiy Nkafu
 Labour Party profile of Sharon Patrick
 Labour Party profile of Saleem Siddiqui
 Chatsworth Road Winter Festival

Wards of the London Borough of Hackney